AlternatiV is an Armenian alternative rock band, formed in 2015 in Yerevan, Armenia.

They became famous after their successful performance at The X Factor television music competition in 2016, where they reached the finals and entered the top ten. The band was mentored by famous Armenian showman and musician Garik Papoyan. In 2018, the band competed in the national selection to represent Armenia in the Eurovision Song Contest 2018 with the song "Stare at Me".

History

AlternatiV band was formed in 2015 at the Russian-Armenian University. The band members are Sargis Burnazyan, Karapet Burnazyan, Areg Petrosyan and Harutyun Saryan. The band’s name has no connection to their music genre. At first, the band only covered famous songs, then started writing their own. In 2016, they successfully participated in X-Factor. In May 2017, they had their first solo concert at the Russian-Armenian University. The band participated in the contest 7 Notes Music Challenge by Serj Tankian.

Members 

Current
 Sargis Burnazyan – lead vocal (2015–present)
 Areg Petrosyan – drums (2015–present)
 Karapet Burnazyan – rhythm guitar (2015–present)

Former
 Alen Amiryan – solo guitar (2015–2018)
 Garik Avakian – keyboards (2015–2017)
 Hayk Hayrumyan – bass guitar (2016–2017)

References

External links 
YouTube channel
Performance at The X Factor

Armenian musical groups
Armenian rock music groups